The Scientific study of religion represents the systematic effort by scholars and researchers to investigate religious phenomena, as well as the sociology of church participation. 

The Society for the Scientific Study of Religion was founded in 1949 by scholars in religion and social science, and it publishes the Journal for the Scientific Study of Religion, a quarterly which "offers perspectives on national and international issues such as brainwashing and cults, religious persecution, and right wing authoritarianism".

The Center for the Scientific Study of Religion (CSSR) at the University of Texas at Austin is a leading center for the sociology of religion, and particularly for the study of religious influences on human behavior and population outcomes. The CSSR went offline in 2007.

See also
Brainwashing
Cults
Religious persecution
Authoritarianism

References

Religious studies